Metropolitan Avenue station may refer to:
 Middle Village–Metropolitan Avenue (BMT Myrtle Avenue Line)
 Metropolitan Avenue station (LIRR)
 Metropolitan Avenue/Lorimer Street (New York City Subway)